Backwater is the first studio album by Australian music duo Kllo. It was released on 20 October 2017.

Critical reception

At Metacritic, which assigns a weighted average score out of 100 to reviews from mainstream critics, the album received an average score of 76, based on 8 reviews, indicating "generally favorable reviews".

Ashley Hampson of Exclaim described the album as "a mature, thoughtful project that explores and attempts to reconcile the ideas of isolation and vulnerability with comfort and familiarity." William Sutton of PopMatters wrote, "There is a strong stylistic motif that carries through, but within this, there is a subtle exploration of sounds and styles, which only an album format would allow, with touches of '90s R&B, UK garage, electronica, and sultry pop all evident." James Kilpin of Clash stated that "Tracks like 'Last Yearn' and 'Too Fast' see them reach new levels of delicacy, with club influences more prominent elsewhere, but the pervasive dreaminess and charm ultimately results in an absorbing debut album."

Jack Tregoning of Junkee placed the album at number 9 on the "10 Best Albums of 2017" list.

Track listing

Personnel
Credits adapted from liner notes.

 Kllo – production
 Simon Lam – mixing
 Andrei Eremin – mixing (on "Virtue"), mastering
 12:01 (Office of Hassan Rahim) – art direction
 Hayley Louisa Brown – photography

References

External links
 

Kllo albums
2017 debut albums
Ghostly International albums
UK bass albums